The 1990 ISF Women's World Championship for softball was held July 13–21, 1990 in Normal, Illinois, United States.  The host United States won their second straight title after the event's final was rained out.  The U.S. was given the title due to a superior ranking than the other finalist, New Zealand, in pool play.

Pool play

Medal round

The gold medal game was rained out.  The United States was awarded the gold medal for a superior round robin record.

External links

Women's Softball World Championship
Softball
1990 in sports in Illinois
Sports competitions in Illinois
International softball competitions hosted by the United States
Softball World Championship
July 1990 sports events in the United States
Women's sports in Illinois